Chain rhyme is a rhyme scheme that links together stanzas by carrying a rhyme over from one stanza to the next.

A number of verse forms use chain rhyme as an integral part of their structures. One example is terza rima, which is written in tercets with a rhyming pattern ABA BCB CDC. Another is the virelai ancien, which rhymes AABAAB BBCBBC CCDCCD.

Other verse forms may also use chain rhyme. For instance, quatrains can be written to the following pattern: AABA BBCB CCDC.

There are a few well-known examples of chain rhyme in world literature. In the Persian language, chain rhyme is almost exclusively devoted to the poetic form of the Rubaiyat: a poem that makes use of quatrains with the rhyme scheme AABA. Though not necessarily chain rhyme, the Rubiyat form has been mimicked throughout the world. Robert Frost made use of Rubaiyat in chain rhyme form in his poem, "Stopping by Woods on a Snowy Evening."

Chain rhyme also known as “chain verse or interlocking rhyme" is a type of poetic technique where the poet uses the last syllable of a line and repeats it as the first syllable of the line following. Although the syllable is repeated, it carries a different meaning. The word “chain” is defined as a series of things connected or following in succession. The repetition of a word from a verse of stanza following the next creates a chain like connection between the lines. 

Rhymes are pleasing to the ears and help to distinguish similarities and differences. It helps the poet to shape the poem and the reader to understand it; creating a link between sound and thought. 

Examples

Two examples of chained verse from William T. Dobson Poetical ingenuities and eccentricities, London, 1882 (see text here for the sources of these examples)

Truth

Nerve thy soul with doctrines noble, 
Noble in the walks of time, 
Time that leads to an eternal,
An eternal life sublime.
Life sublime in moral beauty, 
Beauty that shall never be;
Ever be to lure thee onward,
Onward to the fountain free.
Free to every earnest seeker,
Seeker for the fount of youth;
Youth exultant in its beauty,
Beauty of the living truth.

This is also quoted as an example of chained verse in George Lansing Raymond’s Rhythm and Harmony in Poetry and Music, where it is described as an example taken from "the excellent manual on English Versification of J. C. Parsons" which is probably James C. Parsons English versification for the use of students, Boston, 1891, which also quotes this example.

(in the web page Poetry through the ages (Webexhibits) this poem is erroneously described as a translation of an anonymous French poem and Raymond's book is erroneously described as "a major anthology in America’s colleges and universities in the 1890s and 1900s")

An untitled poem by John Byrom:

My spirit longeth for thee
Within my troubled breast,
Although I be unworthy
Of so divine a guest.
Of so divine a guest,
Unworthy though I be
Yet has my heart no rest,
Unless it comes from thee.
Unless it comes from thee
In vain I look around,
In all that I can see,
No rest is to be found.
No rest is to be found
But in thy blessed love,
Oh let my wish be crowned,
And send it from above.

This example is also cited in the books by George Lansing Raymond and James C. Parsons.

The form is also used in other languages. For instance, the popular French song Trois petits chats consists of chain verse.

References 
Bradley, A. (2009). Book of rhymes: The poetics of hip hop. New York: Basic civitas books pp 75–78.
Preminger, A. & Warnke, F.J. & Hardison, O.B. (1965). Princeton encyclopedia of    poetry and poetics. Princeton, N.J.: Princeton University Press.
George Lansing Raymond (2008). Rhythm and harmony in poetry and music. Dyson Press.
William T. Dobson Poetical ingenuities and eccentricities, London, 1882
James C. Parsons English versification for the use of students, Boston, 1891

Rhyme